Mynarski Death Plummet is a Canadian short film, directed by Matthew Rankin and released in 2014. Blending live action with animation, the film expressionistically imagines the final moments of Andrew Mynarski, a Canadian World War II airman who was posthumously awarded the Victoria Cross for attempting to free colleague Pat Brophy before plummeting to his death from their burning airplane.

The film was named to the Toronto International Film Festival's annual year-end Canada's Top Ten list for 2014. It was a shortlisted Canadian Screen Award nominee for Best Live Action Short Drama at the 4th Canadian Screen Awards, and a shortlisted Jutra Award nominee for Best Short Film at the 17th Jutra Awards.

Cast
 Alek Rzeszowski as Andrew Mynarski
 Robert Vilar as Pat Brophy the trapped rear gunner
 Annie St-Pierre as Annie St-Pierre
 Louis Negin as Mayor of Cambrai
 Eve Majzels and Maryse Lebeau as women of Cambrai

References

External links

2014 films
Canadian drama short films
Canadian World War II films
Canadian aviation films
Films directed by Matthew Rankin
Films about death
2010s war films
2014 short films
World War II aviation films
2010s English-language films
2010s Canadian films
Canadian avant-garde and experimental short films